Evelio Bellaflor Javier (October 31, 1942 – February 11, 1986) was a Filipino politician. He served as governor of the province of Antique and was an opponent of the dictatorship of President Ferdinand Marcos. His assassination on February 11, 1986, was one of the causes of the People Power Revolution that overthrew Marcos.
Evelio Javier's brother, Exequiel Javier, served as congressman from 1987 to 1998 and from 2001 to 2010 and governor from 1998 to 2001, and 2010 to 2015. In 2018, Javier was identified as a Motu Propio human rights violations victim of the Martial Law Era by the Human Rights Victims Claims Board.

Early life and marriage
Evelio Javier was born on October 31, 1942, in Barangay Lanag (now Evelio Javier), Hamtic, Antique, to Everardo Autajay Javier (Moscoso), a prosecutor and Feliza Bellaflor, a teacher. He finished grade school in San Jose Elementary School in San Jose de Buenavista, Antique and graduated high school with first honors and college in Ateneo de Manila University. There, he received his Bachelor of Arts degree in History and Government and he earned his Bachelor of Laws at Ateneo Law School in 1968. He passed the bar examination in 1968 before he became a college professor at the Ateneo, a successful lawyer, and entered into politics.

He married Precious Bello Lotilla, daughter of Vicente Lotilla and Angelina Bello of Sibalom, Antique in Manila on December 29, 1968. They had two sons, Francis Gideon and David Ignatius.

Governor of Antique
Javier ran for governor of Antique and won in 1971 by one of the largest margins in history, making him, at the age of 28, the Philippines' youngest governor. He did not run again for election in 1980. Instead he attended the John F. Kennedy School of Government at Harvard University in 1981 on a scholarship, where he earned a Masters in Public Administration.

May 1984 elections
In 1984, Javier ran for a seat in the Batasang Pambansa to represent Antique's lone district, but lost. He was known to be a crowd favorite wherein he won the hearts of the people of his province. Arturo Pacificador, a member of the Kilusang Bagong Lipunan (KBL) party, was his competition who was known to have a lot of powerful people who supported him.

The heat of the competition between the two climaxed during the eve of the elections on May 13, 1984. Seven of Javier's supporters were killed in what came to be known as the Sibalom Bridge Massacre. This, along with the massive election fraud prompted Javier's filing of a protest at the Supreme Court.

During the time of the elections, it was known that there were a lot of methods to compromise the voting results such as vote-buying and giving threats to voters. This did not only happen on the national level of elections, but also on the local elections. In the province of Antique, ballots of those who voted in the towns of Caluya, Cabate, Tibiao, Barbaza, Laua-an, and San Remigio were not placed in the boxes.

After the counting of the ballots, Pacificador won as the assemblyman for Antique. However, Javier asked to rebuke the decision of the commission due to suspicions of compromising the results of the elections, which the Supreme Court eventually decided in his favor on September 22, 1986, seven months after his death.

Assassination
At 10:00 in the morning of February 11, 1986, three or four masked gunmen riding in a Nissan Patrol jeep went to the New Capitol building in San Jose, Antique. While Javier was talking to friends on the steps in front of the capitol building, the masked gunmen opened fire. Time described the scene:

The toilet was owned by Leon Pe. The News Today at the 20th anniversary reported, "As the prostrated corpse of Javier lied on the damp cement of the comfort room, another gunman, hankering for a kill, unmasked himself and made a shrill outcry - 'Can you recognize me? Stand up and fight!' Whereupon he fired the coup de grace directed at the head..." His body had 24 bullet wounds.

Time reported that many in Javier's camp blamed Pacificador for the assassination:

On the day of his burial in San Jose de Buenavista, Antique, thousands of mourners followed his funeral procession to the cemetery wearing yellow shirts with yellow bands tied to their wrists. They played his favorite song, "The Impossible Dream", during the procession to the cemetery. Thousands of Antiquenos there showed their anger and sorrow by crying "Justice for Evelio! We love you!" on the day of his death.

A ledger from Ferdinand and Imelda Marcos obtained by the Los Angeles Times showed that Javier's political opponent, Arturo Pacificador, received 1 million pesos from the Marcoses 5 days after his killing.

Murder case
After Javier's assassination, his family filed charges against Pacificador, while the Ministry of Justice filed charges against the gunmen. By October 1986, the accusation consisted of 19 people; two noteworthy ones were Javier's rival Pacificador, and Avelino Javellana, his lawyer. Of these 19, at the time only 6 were apprehended and all others were at large including both Pacifador and Javellana. Two of the apprehended, Romeo Nagalese and Jose Delumen, had confessed to the crime and Nagalase was discharged to be used as witness. On July 1, 1987, one of the main suspects in the case, Edgardo Iran, died during a shootout with the Cavite PC Command in Kawit, Cavite. In May 1989, Javellana was arrested, but on his pleas of health and safety was not held in Antique jail, but to be followed by two police escorts to Iloilo Mission Hospital. However, before they could be transferred, the two police officers were recalled by an unforeseen emergency and was instead escorted by the Provinvial Probation Officer of Antique. One of the apprehended Oscar Tianzon pleaded not guilty and Javellana requested right of bail, however opposition was made based on that charges of murder are not given the right of bail if evidence is strong. Tianzon was requested to be discharged as witness as he acted as lookout for the murder and the petition for bail was delayed until this could be resolved. The request was denied and Javellana's right of bail was ruled as:

"The court searched the records for evidence to corroborate the material points in the aforesaid testimony of Tianzon against Javellana but found none to corroborate his statement pointing to Javellana as the gun supplier and the plotter. Neither has the prosecution presented evidence during the hearing to determine Tianzon's qualification tending to corroborate the implication of Javellana nor did the prosecution indicate to the court where such corroboration can be found by the court." Further showing the presiding judge was biased towards the accused was that despite allowing Nagales to be discharged he was not used as witness to two other defendants and their cases were dismissed. The trials were suspended in 1989 when the presiding judge was accused of partiality and the Supreme Court issued a temporary restraining order. Petitions were made to resume the trials but these were denied in that light of the events of people power that it has become moot and academic. During this time Javellana was placed under house arrest under Atty. Deogracias del Rosario. In 1995, Pacificador had resurfaced and was detained. Despite his detainment, Pacificador ran for governor of Antique in the 1995 election, but he lost by a wide margin to Exequiel Javier. Pacificador as well had petitioned for bail and was granted so in 1996. As with above this judge had ignored the witnesses claims and even Pacificador's own admission to being in the ambush site. In the 2000s, trials were once again opened for both of them, but these trials were once again suspended when Pacificador accused the judge of being biased against them. In 2004, the Antique Regional Trial Court acquitted Pacificador and three co-accused. However, Javellana and the others were convicted.

People Power Revolution
The assassination of Javier fueled the People Power Revolution that happened weeks later on February 22, 1986, which ousted Ferdinand Marcos and made Corazon Aquino the President of the Philippines. Javier's body processed through Manila, passing Ateneo de Manila University, where he had thousands of friends and colleagues, days before the revolution.

Legacy
The day of his assassination is now marked as Governor Evelio B. Javier Day and is a special non-working public holiday in the provinces of Antique, Aklan, Capiz, and Iloilo, the four provinces on Panay island.

In September 1986, Supreme Court Associate Justice Isagani Cruz wrote about Javier at the end of his decision in Javier vs. COMELEC:

An airport, Evelio Javier Airport, in San Jose, Antique, was named in honor of Javier.

References

All articles with unsourced statements
1942 births
1986 deaths
20th-century Filipino lawyers
Assassinated Filipino politicians
Ateneans honored at the Bantayog ng mga Bayani
Ateneo de Manila University alumni
Deaths by firearm in the Philippines
Filipino democracy activists
Filipino Roman Catholics
Governors of Antique (province)
Harvard Kennedy School alumni
Karay-a people
Marcos martial law victims
People from Antique (province)